is a railway station in Kyoto, Japan.  It is the terminal station of the Hankyu Arashiyama Line. The station is a short walk from Nakanoshima Park and Togetsukyo Bridge.
In spring, sakura trees lining the station light up in an array of white and pink.

History
The station was opened by Shin-Keihan Railway as the terminus of the branchline on November 9, 1928. It originally had six platforms serving five dead-end tracks, which were later reduced to three platforms for two tracks.

References

Railway stations in Japan opened in 1928
Railway stations in Kyoto